Bridgette Radebe (née Motsepe) is a South African businesswoman of Tswana descent and the sister of South African businessman Patrice Motsepe and First Lady of South Africa Tshepo Motsepe.

Career
She was born on 26 February 1960. Radebe started out as a common miner in the 1980s; managing individual shaft mining operations and producing materials for the larger mine operations in South Africa while working under a contract. She started Mmakau Mining; a mining firm which initiates explorations and helps to produce platinum, gold, and chrome.

Radebe is the President of the South African Mining Development Association and her husband was South Africa's Minister in the Presidency Jeff Radebe. She is also the member of the New Africa Mining Fund and serves on the Sappi Board. Bridgette has criticized the "capitalist mining model" because "it takes land to exploit the materials, the exports create ghost towns, and jobs go overseas." When South Africa was re-created 83% of the natural resources belonged to the racial minority (white people). Today, 91% of the same resources are owned by corporate monopolies. She suggests three solutions to solve the problem: 1) complete nationalization of all mining operations, 2) a state buyout of the mining operations of dwindling profitability in the name of black empowerment, 3) a co-operation movement between public and private sectors over the running of South Africa's mines.

Radebe received an "International Businessperson of the Year Award" in May 2008 by the Global Foundation for Democracy. This award recognizes businesspeople who have made a difference in the world of changing political and environmental landscapes.

On 1–2 July 2011, Radebe played an assisting role in the wedding ceremony of Prince Albert II of Monaco and the former Charlene Wittstock.

In 2019, Radebe was appointed as member of the BRICS Business Council.

References

1960 births
Living people
21st-century South African businesswomen
21st-century South African businesspeople
University of Botswana alumni
20th-century South African businesswomen
20th-century South African businesspeople